Jose Borromeo Legaspi Memorial National High School (JBLMNHS) is a public secondary school located in Barangay Aranas, Balete, Aklan, Philippines. It is recognized by the Department of Education.

About the school

History
Recognizing the need for a secondary school in the barangay, Jean Oquendo Rodriguez who was then the Mayor of Balete, initiated a plan to create a school with Elna Perez Beltran and Abundio R. Guadalupe who worked on the papers for the approval of the proposal. Although there was already a private secondary school in the town, they considered the young people of Aranas who had to endure a long walk across town every morning and afternoon to attend school. The board of directors was then elected. Late Melgasbal Legaspi Oquendo, headed the Board of Directors together with others who gave financial support and worked together to create the school.

In June 1981, building work began on the school and a month later two rooms and an office made of light materials (coconut lumber, bamboos, nipa) were completed. The 94 pioneer students and a teacher spent a month teaching classes at the elementary school until the building was finished. Abundio Guadalupe, who was the Principal of Aranas Elementary School became the Assistant Principal of the school. The school's "Foundation Day" was 27 September 1981. The school was named Jose Borromeo Legaspi Memorial Barangay High School to honour the donor of the land on which the school stands, Jose Borromeo Legaspi, whose daughter, Atty. Lealtad R. Legaspi, often attends as a guest at school events such as Foundation and Graduation Days.

The school was officially opened with a complete secondary course curriculum in 1983. However, a few months after its completion, the first rooms which were just made of light materials were destroyed by the typhoon Undang. A year later another two rooms were built which were connected to other three rooms in the building. Four years later, the Technology and Home Economics building was erected followed by a further building.

Most of the school's students are residents of Barangay Aranas. Other students come from neighbouring villages and towns such as Cortes, Guanko, Oquendo, Morales in Balete, and Lalab in Batan. The school is now a National High School.

The school seal

The boldfaced Jose Borromeo Legaspi Memorial National High School prominently arching across the entire facet of the emblem symbolizes the "whole being" of the institution. It is also a tribute to the late Jose Borromeo Legaspi, the owner and donor of the land where the school is situated.

The Open Book establishes the institution as the place where vast knowledge and wisdom can be gained through various disciplines.

The Torch signifies the enlightenment that the school gives to the community. Its radiant glare that flares unceasingly represents the institution and its faculties commitment to provide formal education for the community.

The Yellow Ribbon embossed with "Founded 1981" marks the school's humble beginnings and recognizes its continuing struggle to fulfill its mission .

The two intertwined Laurels stand for the achievements that the institution, its faculty, its student body and its alumni have acquired, accomplished or attained.

The Ropes enclosing the inner and outer border of the seal unravels the strong bonds existing within the institution. The inner rope depicts the teacher-student affinity. The outer rope portrays the school and community alliance.

The inscribed Aranas, Balete, Aklan pinpoints the school's geographical location.

Administration

Curriculum
Senior High School Program OfferingsI. General Academic Strand(GAS)II. Technical-Vocational-Livelihood(TVL) Track

School Organizations
 I. Parents Teachers Association (PTA)

II. Alumni Association

Jose Borromeo Legaspi Memorial National High School Alumni Association (JBLMNHSAA) is the official organization of JBLMNHS graduates.

Since its humble beginning in 1981, the school already produces 32 batches of graduates from year 1984 up to year 2015. The alumni association already managed to hold five Grand Alumni Homecoming and the sixth will be held on May 18, 2019.

JBLMNHSAA Seal

The name Jose Borromeo Legaspi Memorial National High School Alumni Association arching across the entire facet of the logo is the proud identity of the organization.

The two Stars represent the Parents and Teachers that guides and teach JBLMNHS Alumni to be better and educated persons.

The Nine Human Figures with different colors and each marked with the nine letter acronym of the association's name symbolizes the JBLMNHS Alumni. Each have their own personality and traits but all carries on themselves the collective knowledge, values, ideals and aspirations that a JBLian learns from their Alma Mater.

The motto United in Principles, United in Actions is the spirit cultivated among the members of the group. Each Alumni is urge to do their share with a solemn sense of responsibility, sincerity and dedication.

The term Since 1997 marks as the organization's humble beginning.

The Open Hands carrying the logo conveys the association's mission of caring and giving back for the school.

The Blue Ribbon'' inscribed with "The Vanguard of Thy Future" evoke each alumni's pledge to keep alive their love and loyalty to their Alma Mater, and to keep her good name and integrity untarnished.

III. Academic Clubs

Supreme Student Government (SSG)

English Club

Filipino Club

Mathematics Club

Science Club

Student Technologists and Entrepreneurs of the Philippines (STEP)

Citizenship Advancement Training (CAT)

JBLMNHS Percussion Band

IV. School Publication

School Paper of Active Responsible and Keen Students (SPARKS) is the official school publication of JBLMNHS.

External links
Official Website
JBLMNHS - Official Facebook Page
JBLMNHS Alumni Association - Official Facebook Group

References

Schools in Aklan
High schools in the Philippines
Public schools in the Philippines